Andrew McCord (–1808) was a United States representative from New York. The name is often spelled MacCord, especially in newspapers of the time.

Life
McCord was the son of John McCord who came in 1729 from Ireland to Cape Cod with Charles Clinton.

He was born in Stony Ford, Orange County, New York and attended the common schools and Newburgh Academy. He was a delegate to the convention at New Paltz on November 7, 1775, to choose deputies to the Second Provincial Congress, and was quartermaster in the Ulster County Militia from January 31, 1787, on. He served as captain of the Ulster County Militia and resigned on April 10, 1798.

In 1795, 1796, 1798, 1800, 1802, 1806 and 1807, he was a member of the New York State Assembly; and was speaker in 1807.

McCord was elected as a Democratic-Republican to the Eighth Congress, holding office from March 4, 1803, to March 3, 1805, after which he engaged in agricultural pursuits. He died at Stony Ford in 1808, and was buried in the family burying ground on his farm near Stony Ford.

References

1750s births
1808 deaths
People from Wallkill, Orange County, New York
Quartermasters
Members of the New York State Assembly
Speakers of the New York State Assembly
Year of birth uncertain
Democratic-Republican Party members of the United States House of Representatives from New York (state)